Fleming Park is a public park located in Blue Springs in Jackson County, Missouri. United States.

Recreational Activities 
There are two large lakes within the park: 
Lake Jacomo, covering 
Blue Springs Lake, covering .

Other recreational features located in the park include:
Missouri Town 1855
Native Hoofed Animal Enclosure
Marinas
Campgrounds
Kemper Outdoor Education Center

References

Buildings and structures in Jackson County, Missouri
Kansas City metropolitan area
Parks in the Kansas City metropolitan area
Protected areas of Jackson County, Missouri
Parks in Missouri